McConathy is a surname. Notable people with the surname include:

John McConathy (1930–2016), American basketball player, coach and educator
Mike McConathy (born 1955), American basketball coach